Smart Eye AB, is a publicly traded Swedish technology company, located in Gothenburg, that develops and sells products for machine vision system development and the automotive application of eye tracking. Eye tracking systems use digital cameras to track the movement of the eyes and gaze direction in real time. Smart Eye’s technology is used in driver monitoring systems (DMSs).

Smart Eye's products are sold directly and through resellers and its partners worldwide. The company is made up of three business segments: Automotive Solutions, Research Instruments, and Applied AI Systems. Smart Eye also operates in the United States, China, and Japan.

Smart Eye is publicly traded under SEYE.ST.

History
Smart Eye AB was founded in 1999 as a tech startup with a goal to provide real-time and completely non-invasive eye tracking. The company's first customer was Saab Automobile.

2001 – Release of Smart Eye Pro, a system with flexible camera configuration
2005 – Release of AntiSleep, a mono camera system built on cost efficient hardware for automotive use
2009 – Embedded AntiSleep, complete integrated mono camera automotive grade system running on BlackFin DSP
2012 – DR 120, dual camera eye tracker integrated in a computer monitor 
2013 – Fully automatic initialization for Smart Eye Pro 
2014 – Release of Blackbird, a reference system for the automotive industry
2015 – Release of Aurora, a removable, high-precision screen metering system
2016 – IPO at First North Nasdaq OMX Stockholm 
2017 – Release of Smart AI, a platform for multimodal In-Car Artificial Intelligence

In 2021, Smart Eye's automotive segment made up 63 percent of the company's revenue.

Acquisitions 
In May 2021, Smart Eye acquired Affectiva, an emotion-detection software company, for $73.5 million. In November 2021, Smart Eye acquired iMotions, a human behavior software company.

References

Technology companies of Sweden
Companies based in Gothenburg